William Purves (4 July 1888 – 18 September 1964) was a Scotland international rugby union player.

Rugby Union career

Amateur career

He played for Cambridge University.

He played for London Scottish.

Provincial career

He played for Anglo-Scots district against Provinces District on 26 December 1908, while still with Cambridge University.

He played for Whites Trial against Blues Trial on 6 January 1912.

He played for Blues Trial against Whites Trial on 18 January 1913.

International career

Family

He was the brother of Alex Purves who was also capped for Scotland.

References

Sources

 Bath, Richard (ed.) The Scotland Rugby Miscellany (Vision Sports Publishing Ltd, 2007 )

1888 births
1964 deaths
Scottish rugby union players
Scotland international rugby union players
London Scottish F.C. players
Whites Trial players
Blues Trial players
Rugby union players from London
Scottish Exiles (rugby union) players
Cambridge University R.U.F.C. players
Rugby union locks